Rip Tide is an original novella written by Louise Cooper and based on the long-running British science fiction television series Doctor Who. It features the Eighth Doctor. It was released both as a standard edition hardback and a deluxe edition featuring a frontispiece by Fred Gambino. Both editions have a foreword by Stephen Gallagher.

Plot
Strangers and dangers arise at a sleepy Cornish seaside down. The Doctor struggles to find out what is going on as threats to the townsfolk get worse.

External links
The Cloister Library - Rip Tide

2003 British novels
2003 science fiction novels
Doctor Who novellas
British science fiction novels
Telos Publishing books